NTR: Mahanayakudu is a 2019 Indian Telugu-language biographical film, based on the real life and political career of N. T. Rama Rao, produced by Nandamuri Balakrishna, Sai Korrapati, Vishnu Vardhan Induri under NBK Films, Vaaraahi Chalana Chitram, Vibri Media banners and directed by Krish Jagarlamudi. It is the second movie in a two-part series, with the first being NTR: Kathanayakudu. The film stars Nandamuri Balakrishna, Vidya Balan, Nandamuri Kalyan Ram, Rana Daggubati in the lead roles and its music is composed by M. M. Keeravani. The film received positive reviews and yet bombed badly at the box office.

Plot
The film begins, after NTR announces his party as Telugu Desam. N. T. Rama Rao designs his flag & agenda. He wants to tour across the erstwhile Andhra Pradesh. So, he orders his son Nandamuri Harikrishna to repair an old Chevrolet van to use for his campaign and names it Chaitanya Ratham. He then starts his journey, with Harikrishna as his charioteer and his son-in-law Daggubati Venkateswara Rao also accompanies him. He struggles hard by traveling all over the state for restoring the dignity of the Telugu people and acquires their faith & admiration. The center gets frightened as Andhra Pradesh is a major league to them. So, Prime Minister Indira Gandhi advances the elections and also appoints Kotla Vijaya Bhaskara Reddy as the new Chief Minister. In that situation, Nadendla Bhaskar Rao prepares the list of candidates who are ex MPs and MLAs with bad conduct. Rama Rao denies and replaces them with new young blood.

Thereupon, the Congress party looks down on Nara Chandrababu Naidu as he is the opponent’s son-in-law, yet he contests against his father-in-law’s party but loses. In the elections, Rama Rao wins with a high majority and becomes the 10th Chief Minister of Andhra Pradesh. Meanwhile, humiliated Chandrababu Naidu decides to leave politics but Rama Rao recognizes his caliber and inducts him into the party. There onwards, Rama Rao toils a lot and wears a Saffron as a symbol of his initiation. He always puts check on Bhaskar Rao’s dominance and makes many revolutionary changes in the governance such as ₹2  kg rice for poor people, an equal share to a daughter in father's property, abolishing Patel-Patwari system, creating Mandal system, Telugu Ganga project, etc. He also decides to eradicate corruption and does not spare even his own, to establish a corrupt-free state. Annoyed by all this, Bhaskar Rao aims to demoralize Rama Rao by making a few of his men go against him but Rama Rao does not yield. Eventually, Indira Gandhi does not allocate proper funds to the states. When nobody dares to question, Rama Rao stands up to achieve their rights. Self-esteemed Indira Gandhi decides to stop him for which she appoints Thakur Ram Lal as a new Governor of the state.

Parallelly, Basava Rama Tarakam gets diagnosed with cancer and falls terminally ill. Eventually, Rama Rao also suffers from heart problems, so both of them fly to the US. At that point, Bhaskar Rao makes secret negotiations with Indira Gandhi and she orders to dethrone Rama Rao with the help of Ramlal. The shrewd politician, Chandra Babu Naidu gazes at his intentions and takes all precautionary measures. Soon after Rama Rao’s arrival, Bhaskar Rao submits Motion of no confidence and fraudulently becomes Chief Minister by backstabbing. Immediately, Rama Rao moves to Raj Bhavan to demonstrate his strength of MLAs. But Ramlal does not relent and gets him arrested. After release, Basavaramatarakam fires up his energy, advocates to gain public support, and promises to hold her breath until his return. Now Rama Rao relaunches his Chaitanya Ratham, and mobilizes the support of the people, other Chief Ministers of the country, and anti-Congress political parties. During that plight, Chandrababu Naidu allies him as a backbone by safeguarding the MLAs in a secret place to avoid horse-trading. They all decide to land in Delhi with their MLAs to prove their majority. At every level, Indira Gandhi creates many obstacles but Rama Rao and Chandrababu successfully cross the hurdles and meet President of India Zail Singh who mandates to conduct confidence motion. But Bhaskar Rao cleverly postpones the Assembly sessions and makes all attempts to provoke Rama Rao. During 1 month, a lot of public consciousness arises who revolted against Congress Govt. So, Indira Gandhi also accepts her defeat, dissolves her support to Bhaskar Rao, and unwillingly replaces Shankar Dayal Sharma instead of Ramlal. Shankar Dayal Sharma removes Bhaskar Rao and restores Rama Rao as the Chief Minister. Immediately, after his swearing-in ceremony, Rama Rao reaches his wife. Finally, the movie ends with Basavaramatarakam departing in his lap.

Cast

Production

Filming 
Balakrishna took a break from the shooting between 30 November 2018 and 4 December to campaign in the 2018 Telangana Legislative Assembly election for Telugu Desam Party thus causing a delay of about a week in the shooting schedule. By mid-December, about 90% of the shooting was completed.

Post-production 
In mid-December, the film's post-production works have started.

Release 
NTR: Mahanayakudu was initially planned to be released on 24 January 2019. Later the date was revised to 26 January, then to 7 February coinciding with the release of Yatra on 8 February, a biographical film on former Chief Minister of united Andhra Pradesh Y. S. Rajasekhara Reddy. In January 2019, the crew took a four-day leave to celebrate Sankranti festivites causing a delay in shooting, and post-production work that would take about 10–15 days. The filmmakers thus reportedly planned to release the movie on 14 February. Due to NTR: Kathanayakudu poor performance at the box office, the filmmakers postponed the release of NTR: Mahanayakudu, which was scheduled to be released on 8 February and instead premiered NTR: Kathanayakudu on Amazon Prime Video on 8 February. The makers intended the OTT release to reach a wider audience and act as a marketing stunt for the NTR: Mahanayakudu. Eventually, the movie was released on 22 February.

Box office
The film ended up as one of the biggest commercial failures in Telugu cinema and the biggest commercial failure in Nandamuri Balakrishna's career. It was released with mixed expectations – high expectations from trade analysts and low expectations from others – due to the commercial failure of its prequel NTR: Kathanayakudu. The Telugu Desam Party politicians, including Nandigama MLA Tangirala Sowmya, held free shows at various locations in Andhra Pradesh and provided subsidises for the party's workers and used the film as a medium of campaigning for the upcoming 2019 Andhra Pradesh Legislative Assembly elections.

In its opening weekend, the film earned  worldwide.

Soundtrack

The music is composed by M. M. Keeravani for both the parts. The music released on Lahari Music. The audio and trailer launch of the biopic was held at JRC Convention Center, Hyderabad on 21 December 2018. Veteran Telugu stalwarts Krishna, Krishnam Raju, Mohan Babu, K. Raghavendra Rao, N. T. Rama Rao Jr. and others attended the function along with complete Nandamuri family.

References

External links
 

Films directed by Krish
Films scored by M. M. Keeravani
Films set in Andhra Pradesh
2010s Telugu-language films
Films about actors
Biographical films about politicians
Cultural depictions of Indira Gandhi
2010s biographical films
P. V. Narasimha Rao
Memorials to Chaudhary Charan Singh
Indian biographical films